Perischoechinoidea is a subclass of primitive sea urchins that were abundant in the Palaeozoic seas. However, the great majority of species died out during the Mesozoic, as the more advanced euechinoid sea urchins became common. Today, only a single order, the Cidaroida, survives.

Most fossil forms had multiple columns of ambulacral plates, rather than the two rows found in all living species of sea urchin. They also lacked a perignathic girdle around the mouth.

Taxonomy
The group is probably a paraphyletic assemblage of stem forms, united only by their lack of more advanced features, rather than a true taxonomic clade.

Subclass Perischoechinoidea
 Order Cidaroida
 Order Bothriocidaroida †
 Order Echinocystitoida †
 Order Megalopoda †
 Order Palaechinoida †

References
 
 

Echinoidea
Middle Ordovician first appearances
Extant Ordovician first appearances